Morrano is a village in the municipality of Bierge, in the northwest comarca of Somontano de Barbastro in  province of Huesca, Aragon, Spain. According to the 2010 census (INE), the municipality has a population of 46 inhabitants.

Geography 

Morrano is in pre-Pyrenees, 640 meters high. The Alcandre River and a pine forest border the village.
The municipal is also home to the Sierra y Cañones de Guara Natural Park.

The vegetation mostly consists of olive, the almond, the juniper and holm oak.

History 
In 1097 Peter, Bishop of Huesca, gave the monastery of S. Ponce de Turners Labatella churches, Morrano, Yaso and Panzano.
In 1213 is villa.
In 1887 had 78 homes.

Monuments 
 Parish Church dedicated to St. Peter the Apostle, has romanesque art origin but with several reforms in the 17th and 18th century.
 City hall (year 1733)
 Future museum dedicated to birds. 
 Hermitage of San Martín
 The egg of Morrano or the "Peña Falconera", is a geological formation.

Demographics

Sport  

Around the village can practice canyoning and hiking.

See also 
 Sierra y Cañones de Guara Natural Park
 Peña Falconera

References

External links
Morrano's Description Literary Articles AltoAragón

Localities of Spain
Geography of the Province of Huesca